The University of Montana Grizzly Marching Band is the school band of the University of Montana. As of 2017, the band had about 130 members.

Program
The band was started in the late 1800s. It largely specializes in contemporary corps-style outdoor marching, playing at every home game. The group travels to several conference games in the Northwest and has accompanied the football team to four Division I-AA National Championships. In addition to the game-day entertainment, it makes several appearances in the community each season.

References
University of Montana Grizzly Marching Band website
Videos of Grizzly Marching Band in 2008 season

College marching bands in the United States
Montana Grizzlies and Lady Griz
Student life at the University of Montana